The Little Satilla River (formerly the St. Illa River) is a  tidal river that forms the boundary between Glynn and Camden counties in the U.S. state of Georgia.  It is a separate river from the Little Satilla River,  to the northwest, which is a freshwater tributary of the Satilla River.

The Rural Felicity Plantation formerly stood near the southern banks of the river.

See also
List of rivers of Georgia

References 

Rivers of Georgia (U.S. state)
Rivers of Glynn County, Georgia
Rivers of Camden County, Georgia